Marquan McCall (born March 26, 1999) is an American football nose tackle for the Carolina Panthers of the National Football League (NFL). He played college football at Kentucky.

College career
McCall played at Kentucky from 2018 to 2021.

Professional career
McCall signed with the Carolina Panthers as an undrafted free agent on April 30, 2022, following the 2022 NFL Draft. He made the Panthers' final 53 man roster after training camp.

References

External links
 Carolina Panthers bio
 Kentucky Wildcats bio

1999 births
Living people
American football defensive tackles
Sportspeople from Michigan
Kentucky Wildcats football players
Carolina Panthers players
Sportspeople from Detroit